Bank of America Plaza is a supertall skyscraper between Midtown Atlanta and Downtown Atlanta. At , the tower is the 125th-tallest building in the world . It has 55 stories of office space and was completed in 1992, when it was called NationsBank Plaza. Originally intended to be the headquarters for Citizens & Southern National Bank (which merged with Sovran Bank during construction), it became NationsBank's property following its formation in the 1991 hostile takeover of C&S/Sovran by NCNB.

Architectural details 
The building was developed by Cousins Properties and designed by the architectural firm Kevin Roche John Dinkeloo and Associates LLC. Designed in the Postmodern style reminiscent of Art Deco, it was built in only 14 months, one of the fastest construction schedules for any  building. The Plaza's imposing presence is heightened by the dark color of its exterior. It soars into the sky with vertical lines that reinforce its height while also creating an abundance of revenue-generating corner offices.

There is a  obelisk-like spire at the top of the building echoing the shape of the building as a whole. Most of the spire is covered in 23 karat (96 percent) gold leaf. The open-lattice steel pyramid underneath the obelisk glows yellow-orange at night due to lighting. At its most basic, this is a modern interpretation of the Art Deco theme seen in the Empire State Building and the Chrysler Building. The inhabited part of the building actually ends abruptly with a flat roof. On top of this is built a pyramid of girders, which are gilded and blaze at night, with the same type of yellow-orange high-pressure sodium (HPS) lighting used in older-style street lights. Its design has been characterized as similar to the Messeturm in Frankfurt am Main, Germany.

The skyscraper, built at a 45-degree angle to the city's street grid, is set back off its eastern and western street boundaries, Peachtree Street and West Peachtree Street, by over 50 yards (45 m). This setback is filled, variously, by driveways, parking garage entrances, potted plants, granite staircases, and sloping lawns. The building directly abuts the sidewalk on North Avenue, its northern boundary, with access to this street through a parking garage entrance and stairs leading from the building's main lobby.

Some urban planners decry the building as a Corbusian "tower in a park", as it actively disengages itself from the urban environment surrounding it, entirely omitting sidewalk-facing retail space. Critics argue that the building encourages its tenants to access it primarily by car and to remain inside the complex during the day. However it is across the street from the MARTA-rail North Avenue station.

Developers have rumored that the land under the surrounding driveways and lawns may be redeveloped into low- and mid-rise mixed-use buildings with street-fronting uses as the area urbanizes and the value of land in Midtown Atlanta increases. In 2014, new sidewalks, pavers, ADA ramps, pedestrian light-poles, improved tree wells, new bike racks and landscaping were planned. These neighborhood improvements were completed by 2016 at a cost of $1.04 million.

Upon its completion Bank of America Plaza was the tallest building in the United States outside New York City and Chicago, and the 8th-tallest building in the U.S. overall.

Renovations and sustainable building initiative 

In 2014, a $30 million renovation to the lobby, health club, and conference facility was completed  It has also achieved Leadership in Energy and Environmental Design (LEED) Silver certification. The building and property management were awarded Metro Atlanta Chamber of Commerce E3 Liquid Assets, a recognition in water sustainability. Midtown Atlanta's Midtown Alliance also recognized it as an EcoDistrict Green Luminary for its significant commitment to sustainability practices.

Beginning in 2016, $15 million will be invested over the next few years to significantly modernize the common areas including the lobby, west wing and some deferred maintenance.

Building ownership 

BentleyForbes acquired the building from Cousins Properties in 2006 for $436 million, a record price at $348 per square foot. In 2012, LNR and lenders acquired the property via foreclosure.

In 2013, CWCapital took over the asset management, sponsoring and representing the building's bond holders from LNR and hired real estate services company Cushman & Wakefield and property manager Onyx Equities.

In 2016, a fund managed by San Francisco-based Shorenstein Properties acquired the building. CBRE Group was hired to head leasing efforts.

The largest tenant in the building is Troutman Sanders, a law firm.

In 2022, CP Group, the second-largest landlord in Atlanta, and HPS Investment Partners acquired the iconic building in a joint venture for an undisclosed price.

In popular culture
The building appears as the headquarters of Westgroup Energy in the AMC period drama Halt and Catch Fire.

Gallery

See also 
 List of tallest buildings in the United States
 List of tallest buildings by U.S. state
 List of tallest buildings in Atlanta
 Downtown Atlanta
 Midtown Atlanta

References

External links 

Official building website

Office buildings completed in 1992
Bank of America buildings
Skyscraper office buildings in Atlanta
Roche-Dinkeloo buildings
1992 establishments in Georgia (U.S. state)